The  2020 PGA Championship was the 102nd edition of the PGA Championship, and the first of golf's three major championships played in 2020. It was held August 6–9 at TPC Harding Park in San Francisco, California, having originally been scheduled for May 14–17. Due to the COVID-19 pandemic, it was the first major played in over a year, and had no spectators in attendance. It was the first major held at Harding Park, which had previously hosted World Golf Championship events in 2005 and 2015, and the 2009 Presidents Cup.

In his PGA Championship debut, and second major appearance, Collin Morikawa won by two strokes ahead of runners-up Paul Casey and Dustin Johnson. Multiple players competed for the lead in the final round, and it was only after a birdie on the 14th, and an eagle on the short par-4 16th, that Morikawa was able to break away from the field. At age 23, he became the third youngest PGA Championship winner since World War II, behind Rory McIlroy and Jack Nicklaus, and rose from 12th to 5th in the Official World Golf Ranking. Morikawa also set a new PGA Championship scoring record for the final 36 holes with 129 strokes (65-64).

Casey's second place was his best finish in his 64 career major starts, the most by any player since 2002 without a victory. Johnson repeated his second place standing from the previous edition. Brooks Koepka entered the tournament as two-time defending champion and looking to become the second player after Walter Hagen to win three straight titles; tied for fourth place after round three, and only two shots behind the leader, he was expected to challenge for the title, but struggled in the final round and finished in a tie for 29th place. The top three players in the world rankings heading into the tournament were Justin Thomas (winner of a WGC event the previous week), Jon Rahm, and Rory McIlroy, but none of them were able to contend for the title.

Venue

This was the first major championship held at Harding Park. It was also the first PGA Championship in the Western United States since 1998 at Sahalee Country Club near Seattle, Washington, and the first in California since 1995 at Riviera Country Club in Los Angeles.

Harding Park had previously held the 2015 WGC-Match Play Championship, won by Rory McIlroy, the 2009 Presidents Cup won by the United States, and the 2005 WGC-American Express Championship won by Tiger Woods.

Before the COVID-19 pandemic up to 40,000 spectators per day had been expected to attend.

Course layout

Field

The PGA Championship field is regarded as one of the strongest in professional golf, with the highest strength of field rating of the year according to the Official World Golf Ranking, including almost all of the top one hundred players in the rankings. A number of qualification criteria were used to determine the field, including past PGA champions, recent major winners, top finishers in the 2019 PGA Championship, Ryder Cup players, tournament and leading money winners on the PGA Tour, and twenty PGA club or teaching professionals. The PGA of America also issue invitations to players outside of these criteria, which is generally seen to include the top one hundred in the world rankings.

Seventeen former PGA champions were in the field, including two-time defending champion Brooks Koepka, who was aiming to become the second player to win three in a row after Walter Hagen who won four in a row from 1924 to 1927, world number one Justin Thomas, number three Rory McIlroy, and four-time champion Tiger Woods. Among the former champions not to play were Yang Yong-eun, Pádraig Harrington, John Daly and Vijay Singh, who withdrew due to various concerns about the COVID-19 pandemic, health and injury. Francesco Molinari, winner of the 2018 Open Championship, also withdrew.

Following the cancellation of the 2020 PGA Professional Championship the qualification criteria for PGA club professionals was changed, and determined based on the top 20 in the 2019 PGA Professional Player of the Year Standings; they included 60-year-old Jeff Hart in his fourth PGA Championship, and 62-year old Jeff Roth in his sixth. None of the club professionals made the cut.

The field of 156 was completed by PGA of America invitees followed by leading money winners on the PGA Tour since the 2019 championship. Among the invitees was Li Haotong, one of few from outside the top 100 in the world rankings; he went on to lead the championship by two strokes at the halfway stage, before finishing in a tie for seventeenth place. Several players withdrew from the championship, with eleven alternates gaining a place as a result (one alternate, Ryan Moore, also withdrew). Among the withdrawals were leading European players Lee Westwood and Eddie Pepperell who, like Harrington, cited concerns surrounding the COVID-19 pandemic and traveling to the United States.

The last player to qualify was Richy Werenski, who gained his place by winning the Barracuda Championship the week prior to the PGA Championship, and the final player to take their place in the field was twelfth alternate Alex Norén, who had missed out on automatic qualification as a member of the European Ryder Cup team in 2018 having dropped out of the top 100 in the world rankings.

Weather
Thursday: Partly cloudy. Wind W 10-15 mph , with gusts to 20 mph. Conditions windier for afternoon starters.
Friday: Partly cloudy. Wind WSW 10-15 mph , with gusts to 25 mph.
Saturday: Mostly Cloudy. Wind WSW 10-15 mph , with gusts to 20 mph.
Sunday: Mostly cloudy. Wind WSW 10-15 mph , with gusts to 20 mph.

Round summaries

First round
Thursday, August 6, 2020

Jason Day, the 2015 champion, opened the tournament with a bogey-free round of 65 (five under par). He was joined at the top of the leaderboard by Brendon Todd, who was playing in his first PGA Championship in five years after falling to as low as 2,043rd in the world rankings two years earlier. Brooks Koepka, looking to become the first player in 93 years to win the PGA Championship for the third straight year, was one of nine players tied for third place at four under par; former major champions Zach Johnson, Martin Kaymer and Justin Rose were also in the group alongside Koepka.

Bryson DeChambeau reached four under through ten holes, but dropped strokes over his last eight holes to finish at two under par. On the same score was 15-time major champion, and four-time PGA champion, Tiger Woods, who was playing alongside world number one Justin Thomas (one over par) and Rory McIlroy (even par).

The scoring average for the first round was 71.12, the lowest for an opening-round in PGA Championship history. Todd was the only player in the top 10 to play in the windier afternoon conditions.

Second round
Friday, August 7, 2020

Li Haotong, the 114th-ranked player in the world, shot a bogey-free round of 65 (five under par) to take a two stroke lead after 36 holes. Li became the first player from China to lead a major championship after any round. The lowest rounds of the day came from Tommy Fleetwood and Cameron Champ, who returned six under par rounds of 64. Fleetwood finished in a group of six players tied for second place that included two-time defending champion Brooks Koepka, 2015 champion Jason Day and 2013 U.S. Open champion Justin Rose. Champ ended the day a further stroke behind, in a tie for eighth place with Paul Casey and Brendon Todd.

The cut came at one over par, with 79 players making it through to the final two rounds over the weekend. Among those who missed the cut were Martin Kaymer and Zach Johnson, who were tied for third place after the opening round; Jim Furyk and Richy Werenski, who had both won tournaments the previous week; and Rickie Fowler, who whiffed a short putt on his sixteenth hole of the day and went on to finish just one stroke outside the cut-line, ending a run of 14 cuts made in major championships.

Third round
Saturday, August 8, 2020

Dustin Johnson returned a five under par round of 65, the joint-lowest round of the day which included a career high eight birdies for a round in a major championship, to take the lead at nine under par. Scottie Scheffler and Collin Morikawa matched Johnson's score for the day to also make their way into the top five. Scheffler made three straight birdies on holes 15, 16 and 17 to get into a tie for second place with Cameron Champ, one stroke behind Johnson. Morikawa finished a further stroke behind alongside Paul Casey and Brooks Koepka, who was two under par for his round and tied for the lead before making three straight bogeys on the back nine; he rebounded with birdies on two of his final three holes to get back near the top of the leaderboard.

Six players finished the day tied for seventh place, three strokes off the lead. They were first round leader Jason Day, Daniel Berger, Justin Rose, Tommy Fleetwood, Tony Finau and Bryson DeChambeau. Overnight leader Li Haotong was still at the head of the field through twelve holes; he then made a double-bogey on the 13th hole after losing his ball in the trees and two further bogeys to return a three over par round of 73 and finish in a tie for 13th place, four strokes off the lead.

Seventeen players were within four shots of the lead going into the final round, the most at the PGA Championship since 1993.

Final round
Sunday, August 9, 2020

With the last groups all playing the final nine holes, seven players were tied for the lead at 10 under par – Dustin Johnson, Paul Casey, Scottie Scheffler, Collin Morikawa, Tony Finau, Jason Day and Matthew Wolff, who held the lead in the clubhouse. Morikawa, making his PGA Championship debut, was the first to reach 11 under par with a chip-in for birdie from 54 feet off the front of the green at the 14th hole. He was soon joined by Casey, with a birdie at the short par-4 16th hole. Playing in the group behind Casey, Morikawa found the green with his tee shot at the 16th and holed his putt from seven feet for eagle to open up a two stroke lead. He parred the final two holes for a round of 64 (six under par) and finished at 13 under par for the tournament, two ahead of Casey who also finished with two pars for a round of 66 (four under par).

Johnson, the 54-hole leader, was even par for his round through 15 holes before chipping in for birdie at the 16th and holing a 17-foot birdie putt at the 18th to finish at 11 under par, alongside Casey and two behind Morikawa. It was Johnson's fifth runner-up finish in a major and second consecutive second-place at the PGA Championship.

Bryson DeChambeau birdied four of his first seven holes to jump into a tie for the lead, before consecutive bogeys on the 8th and 9th holes saw him drop back; he made two more birdies on the back nine for a round of 66 and finished tied for fourth, his first top-10 in a major championship. Wolff, playing in his first major, shared fourth place, having held the clubhouse lead at 10 under par after a round of 65. Day, Finau and Scheffler also finished tied for fourth place. Brooks Koepka, attempting to become the first player since Walter Hagen to win three straight PGA Championships, began the day two shots back but was four over par for the first nine holes and dropped out of contention; he closed with a round of 74, the second-worst of anyone in the field, to tie for 29th place.

Morikawa's score of 129 on the weekend was a new PGA Championship record, one shot better than Tiger Woods in 2018. His final-round score of 64 tied Steve Elkington in 1995 for best by a champion. He was also the ninth player in PGA Championship history to win the tournament at their first attempt, the most recent being Keegan Bradley in 2011.

Final leaderboard

Note: Top 15 and ties qualify for the 2021 PGA Championship; top 4 and ties qualify for the 2021 Masters Tournament

Scorecard
Final round

Cumulative tournament scores, relative to par

Media 
ESPN and CBS had the media rights to the 2020 PGA Championship. This marked the first year of the new media rights deal signed in October 2018, replacing the old deal with TNT and CBS. In the UK and Ireland, Sky Sports broadcast the event.

References

External links 

Coverage on the PGA Tour's official site
Coverage on the European Tour's official site
Media Guide
GCSAA tournament fact sheet

PGA Championship
Golf in California
Sports competitions in San Francisco
PGA Championship
PGA Championship
PGA Championship
PGA Championship
PGA Championship